The 1962 Provincial Speedway League was the third season of the Provincial League.

Summary
Thirteen speedway teams took part. Bradford, at their new venue at Greenfields Stadium, returned to the league after missing the previous season due to delays building their new track. The league season proved to be disastrous for Bradford and the club folded at the end of the year. New team Neath Welsh Dragons joined the league and Leicester joined after dropping down from the National League. Neath, near Port Talbot in Wales, was not a successful venue and many of their fixtures were raced at St. Austell. Rayleigh Rockets had withdrawn.

Poole won the league championship for the second year in a row.

Final table

M = Matches; W = Wins; D = Draws; L = Losses; Pts = Total Points

Top Five Riders (League only)

Provincial League Knockout Cup
The 1962 Provincial League Knockout Cup was the third edition of the Knockout Cup for the Provincial League teams. Exeter Falcons were the winners.

First round

Second round

Semi-finals

Final

See also
List of United Kingdom Speedway League Champions
Knockout Cup (speedway)

References

Speedway Provincial League
Provincial Speedway
Provincial Speedway